Gandelu is a commune in the Aisne department in Hauts-de-France in northern France. It belongs to the arrondissement of Château-Thierry and to the canton of Villers-Cotterêts.

Population

See also
 Communes of the Aisne department

References

Communes of Aisne
Aisne communes articles needing translation from French Wikipedia